"Provider"  is a song by American singer-songwriter Frank Ocean, released as a single on the seventh episode of Blonded Radio. Shortly after the release, Ocean released a lyric video for the song on his website, with the words on screen being highlighted by a hopping Hello Kitty head.

Background
During the first hour of the 2017 MTV Music Video Awards show, Frank Ocean premiered a surprise episode of Blonded Radio. At the end of the mix, "Provider" was played on loop featuring several different versions with intro and outro variations.

Track listing

References

Frank Ocean songs 
2017 singles
2017 songs
Songs written by Frank Ocean